Homer Doliver House (July 21, 1878 - December 21, 1949) was an American botanist from New York State.

References

External links

1878 births
1949 deaths
American botanists